This is a chronological list of officially released and leaked songs by the American R&B-Pop group Destiny's Child.

Released songs

See also 
 Destiny's Child discography
 Beyoncé Knowles discography
 Kelly Rowland discography
 Michelle Williams discography
 LeToya Luckett discography

Notes

References

External links 
 Destiny's Child — official website.

Destiny's Child